Jürgen Becker may refer to:

 Jürgen Becker (comedian) (born 1959), German comedian
 Jürgen Becker (poet) (born 1932), German poet